Teodora Mirčić (born 3 March 1988) is a retired Serbian tennis player. She won three singles and 33 doubles titles on the ITF Circuit, and also played for the Serbia Fed Cup team.

Personal life
Teodora Mirčić was born to Miomir and Draginja Mirčić in Belgrade, and also has a brother, Radovan. A great fan of sports, she cites hardcourt as her favourite surface, and Roger Federer and Monica Seles her idols. Mirčić began training tennis aged 8 at Belgrade's tennis club As. She trained at the Nick Bollettieri Tennis Academy in Bradenton, Florida with a full scholarship, and currently resides in Sarasota, Florida. She also earned a Bachelor’s degree in Psychology at Indiana East University.

Tennis career
Teodora Mirčić was one of the best doubles players Serbia has had on the pro tour. She is the only female Serbian tennis player to win 33 ITF doubles titles. In singles, Mirčić was always ranked amongst the top 5 in the country. As a young player, she started competing on both WTA Tour and ITF Circuit tournaments. She also captured three ITF singles titles. 
As a young player, Mirčić played her first WTA Tour qualifying in 2005, at the Budapest Grand Prix. She then earned a wildcard for the 2006 Budapest Grand Prix, losing to Kaia Kanepi in the first round.  In 2009, Mirčić played qualifying for two WTA Tour events, the Morocco Open and the Swedish Open. At the 2011 Budapest Grand Prix, she played singles qualifying, losing to Aleksandra Krunić in the second round. Along with Laura Thorpe, Mirčić competed in doubles at the 2011 Palermo International. The pair defeated fourth seeds Sorana Cîrstea and Andreja Klepač in a super tiebreak in the first round and later reached the semifinals. She lost to Karin Knapp in the last round of singles qualifying. Mirčić reached another doubles semifinal at a WTA event, partnering Veronika Kapshay in Bad Gastein (July 2013), as well as a quarterfinal at the Tashkent Open.

Mirčić joined the Serbia Fed Cup team in 2008, playing with Jelena Janković, Ana Ivanovic and Ana Jovanović against Poland. Ivanovic defeated Urszula Radwańska, and then Janković defeated Agnieszka Radwańska, securing Serbia a place in World Group II. In the dead rubber, Mirčić and Jovanović lost to Klaudia Jans and Alicja Rosolska in straight sets. The same Serbian team played against Croatia. Mirčić lost her singles match, but Janković, Ivanovic and Jovanović defeated their opponents, with Serbia winning the tie 3–2. Mirčić and Jovanović also played a doubles match, but retired for a final 4–1 result. Mirčić has not played in the Fed Cup since 2008.

ITF Circuit finals

Singles: 6 (3–3)

Doubles: 49 (33–16)

Fed Cup participation

Singles (0–1)

Doubles (0–2)

References

External links
 
 
 

1988 births
Living people
Tennis players from Belgrade
Serbian female tennis players
Serbia and Montenegro female tennis players